Robert Noble was a weaving and textiles business based in the Scottish borders town of Peebles. The origins of the company can be traced back to 1666 when it was formed in Galashiels under the name of David Ballantyne. It was at one time listed amongst the oldest surviving UK businesses.

During the next two hundred years the company grew, developed and over time was merged with other businesses including George Roberts & Co. of Selkirk, Walter Thorburn of Hawick and Henry Ballantyne of Walkerburn. In 1884 it moved to a new purpose built mill at March Street in Peebles; the home of Robert Noble until late 2015.

During the twentieth century Ballantyne's formed part of the Dawson International business. However, during the latter part of the twentieth century the UK textiles industry went through various re-structuring and Robert Noble was sold off as a separate business.

The Robert Noble business had lost significant sales in early 2000s when Ministry of Defence contracts for Scottish Regiments were sent outside the UK.

In 2015, after trying to sell the company privately, the management publicly put the site up for sale. Unable to find buyers for the site, Robert Noble was sold to Magee's in Ireland and Replin was sold to AW Hainsworth based in Yorkshire. After the Scottish Government rejected Moorbrook Ltd’s proposals for redevelopment of the site, it agreed to Peebles Community Trust’s request to register a Community Right to Buy (CRtB), which would allow the community first option, under certain conditions, to negotiate purchase of the land should the owners place it on the open market.

References

External links
 Company Website

Historic images of March Street Mills 

 Historic aerial photographs of March Street Mills
 Image of railway waggon advertising March Street Mills 
 Plan of railway siding at March Street Mills
 Image of old railway line at March Street Mills

Recent references about Robert Noble 

 Picture of March Street Mill in 2014
 Visit around March Street Mill 
 Video of Robert Noble visit
 Duchamp video about Robert Noble
 Royal visit to March Street Mill in 2013

History of Ballantyne's businesses 

 Ballantyne's Mill history

Peebles history 

 History of Peebles 1850 - 1990, including information on March Street Mills

Clothing companies of Scotland
Companies based in the Scottish Borders
Manufacturing companies of Scotland
Scottish fashion
Tartan
Textile manufacturers of Scotland
Textile companies of the United Kingdom
Textile mills in Scotland
Clothing companies of the United Kingdom
Manufacturing companies of the United Kingdom